The River Wampool is a river flowing through north western Cumbria in England. It is in the Waver and Wampool (or Wampool and Waver) catchment which includes the towns of Silloth and Wigton.

The river is formed at Chalkfoot near East Curthwaite, above which it is known as Chalk Beck. This helps define the western edge of Inglewood Forest.

Chalk Beck rises close to Wavergillhead and runs north, meeting Iron Gill and proceeding through a wooded clough to Chalkfoot.

Later, the infant River Wampool is joined by Gill Beck at West Curthwaite and Whinnow Beck at Micklethwaite.

The river continues northwards through Biglands, where it is joined by Bampton Beck and Wampool, towards Angerton, where it bends westwards, meeting Solway Firth at Anthorn.

For much of its length the river forms the boundary between the parishes of Woodside to the west and Thursby and Aikton to the east and north.

References

Wampool, River
Inglewood Forest